Fosmanogepix is an experimental antifungal drug being developed by Pfizer.  It is being investigated for its potential to treat various fungal infections including aspergillosis, candidaemia, and coccidioidomycosis.

Fosmanogepix is a prodrug and is converted into the active drug form, manogepix, after administration.  Manogepix targets the inositol acyltransferase Gwt1 (Glycosylphosphatidylinositol-anchored Wall protein Transfer 1), an enzyme in the glycosylphosphatidylinositol (GPI) anchor biosynthesis pathway.  Inhibiting this enzyme prevents the fungi from producing certain proteins essential to its life cycle.  This mechanism of action is novel; therefore, if approved, fosmanogepix would become a first-in-class medication.

References 

Aminopyridines
Isoxazoles
Antifungals
Prodrugs
Organophosphates
Zwitterions
Experimental drugs